Indian Pass is a small area on the south coast of Gulf County, Florida, 8 miles south of Port St. Joe. It promotes itself as an uncrowded haven for sports fisherman and water enthusiasts, and for dining featuring locally caught oysters. A ferry provides access to a wildlife sanctuary on St Vincent Island. Indian Pass is commonly thought of as one of the last bastions of "Old Florida" living.

Indian Pass is located at 29°41'25" North, 85°15'51" West. The name refers to a natural pass leading from Apalachicola Bay to the Gulf of Mexico.

Geography of Gulf County, Florida
Populated coastal places in Florida on the Gulf of Mexico
Inlets of Florida